The Wildrose is a lesbian bar in Seattle, Washington. It is located in the Capitol Hill neighborhood, and opened in 1984. It is the city's only lesbian bar.

Business partners Shelley Brothers and Martha Manning are the current owners of The Wildrose Bar.

References

External links

 Official website
 Zagat review of Wildrose Seattle

1984 establishments in Washington (state)
Capitol Hill, Seattle
Lesbian culture in the United States
LGBT drinking establishments in Washington (state)
LGBT nightclubs in Seattle
Women in Washington (state)